Lynn Stegner is an American author.

Her 2007 novel Because a Fire Was in My Head won the Faulkner Award for Best Novel.

She was married to Page Stegner.

Books
Undertow (Baskerville Publishers, 1993)
Fata Morgana (Baskerville Publishers, 1995)
Pipers at the Gates of Dawn (University Press of New England, 2000)
Because a Fire Was in My Head (University of Nebraska Press, 2007)

References

External links

American women writers
Living people
Year of birth missing (living people)
Place of birth missing (living people)
20th-century American novelists
21st-century American novelists